A370 may refer to:

 A370 highway (Russia), a road in Russia that forms part of the Trans-Siberian Highway.
 A370 road. a road in Bristol and Somerset, England